Tingena homodoxa is a species of moth in the family Oecophoridae. It is endemic to New Zealand and is found in the southern parts of the South Island. It inhabits open grassy slopes and is on the wing from November until January.

Taxonomy 
This species was first described by Edward Meyrick in 1883 using specimens he collected near Lake Wakatipu in December. He originally named the species Oecophora homodoxa. Meyrick went on to give a fuller description of the species in 1884. In 1915 Meyrick placed this species within the Borkhausenia genus. In 1926 Alfred Philpott studied the genitalia of the male of this species. George Hudson discussed and illustrated this species under the name B. homodoxa in his 1928 publication The butterflies and moths of New Zealand. In 1988 J. S. Dugdale placed this species in the genus Tingena. The male lectotype, is held at the Natural History Museum, London.

Description 

Meyrick originally described this species as follows:

Meyrick in 1884 described this species as follows:

Distribution
This species is endemic to New Zealand and has been found on the lower slopes of Mount Aurum near Lake Wakatipu as well as at Ben Lomond.

Behaviour 
The adults of this species are on the wing from November until January.

Habitat 
This species inhabits open grassy slopes at altitudes of around 3000 ft.

References

Oecophoridae
Moths of New Zealand
Moths described in 1883
Endemic fauna of New Zealand
Taxa named by Edward Meyrick
Endemic moths of New Zealand